Silenoz (born Sven Atle Kopperud, 1 March 1977) is a Norwegian guitarist who is a founding member, along with Shagrath and Tjodalv, of the Norwegian symphonic black metal band Dimmu Borgir, of which he is the primary songwriter. He is also guitarist for the death metal supergroup Insidious Disease.

Biography
Silenoz has been Dimmu Borgir's guitarist since they started. He also composes and writes lyrics for most of the band's songs. He contributes vocals (on "Stormblåst", its re-record, and "Godless Savage Garden") and bass (on "Stormblåst MMV"). He also sang lead vocals on their debut album "For All Tid". At first, he was known only as Erkekjetter Silenoz (Arch-Heretic Silenoz in Norwegian).

Another band Silenoz, or "Ed Damnator" as he was called, played rhythm guitar and occasional bass in was the Norwegian thrash metal band, "Nocturnal Breed". Before becoming a musician Silenoz used to work in a kindergarten.

Silenoz has written the majority of Dimmu Borgir's lyrics and also based the songs in the album In Sorte Diaboli on a narrative of his composition.

Silenoz was featured as a voice actor in the Adult Swim cartoon Metalocalypse.  This episode kicked off the second season of the popular show and debuted on Adult Swim Fix on Friday 21 September 2007.

Silenoz originally played bass, but he 'felt limited by only four strings'. He has played guitar since 1991, saying that he was inspired to play the guitar by Judas Priest, Randy Rhoads and Eddie Van Halen - in his words 'Real guitar players'.

For many years as guitarist in Dimmu Borgir, Silenoz appeared with long hair. However, as of 2012 he has appeared with a shaven head whilst maintaining a beard and various piercings.

Stage name
Silenoz explained in an interview that his stage-name is derived from an alternative Latinised spelling of the Greek "Silenus," the name of a satyr-like being in Greek mythology who was a tutor to the wine god Dionysus, and was said to possess special knowledge and the power of prophecy while intoxicated. In the early days of the band, he used as stage name Erkekjetter Silenoz (erkekjetter being Norwegian for "arch heretic"), having it shortened later to Silenoz.

Equipment
ESP Okkultist Custom V guitars (Maroon & Natural Finishes)
ESP SV Series guitars
ESP Viper guitar
Jackson Guitars (formerly)
Seymour Duncan pickups
EMG Pickups (formerly)
Marshall amplifiers
Mesa Boogie amplifiers
ENGL amplifiers
Blackstar amplifiers
Boss guitar effects
Dean Markley - Blue Steel guitar strings
Dunlop Tortex picks
Shure wire-less systems

Videography
 Behind the Player: Dimmu Borgir (DVD, 2010, Alfred Music Publishing)

References

External links 
 

1972 births
Living people
People from Nannestad
Dimmu Borgir members
Rhythm guitarists
Norwegian male bass guitarists
Norwegian black metal musicians
Norwegian heavy metal guitarists
Norwegian heavy metal singers
Norwegian male singers
Norwegian multi-instrumentalists
Norwegian rock guitarists
Norwegian rock singers
Norwegian songwriters
Place of birth missing (living people)
21st-century Norwegian bass guitarists